Tokyo Girl may refer to:

 Tokyo Girl (2008 TV series), a 2008–2009 Japanese drama television series that aired on BS-TBS
 Tokyo Girl (2016 TV series), a 2016–2017 Japanese drama television series
 "Tokyo Girl", a song by Japanese girl group Perfume from their 2018 album Future Pop